Catachresis (from Greek , "abuse"), originally meaning a semantic misuse or error—e.g., using "militate" for "mitigate", "chronic" for "severe", "travesty" for "tragedy", "anachronism" for "anomaly", "alibi" for "excuse", etc.—is also the name given to many different types of figures of speech in which a word or phrase is being applied in a way that significantly departs from conventional (or traditional) usage.

Variant definitions

There are various characterizations of catachresis found in the literature.

Examples
Dead people in a graveyard being referred to as inhabitants is an example of catachresis.

Example from Alexander Pope's Peri Bathous, Or the Art of Sinking in Poetry:
Masters of this [catachresis] will say,
Mow the beard,
Shave the grass,
Pin the plank,
Nail my sleeve.

Use in literature
Catachresis is often used to convey extreme emotion or alienation. It is prominent in baroque literature and, more recently, in dadaist and surrealist literature.

Use in philosophy and criticism
In Jacques Derrida's ideas of deconstruction, catachresis refers to the original incompleteness that is a part of all systems of meaning. He proposes that metaphor and catachresis are tropes that ground philosophical discourse.

Postcolonial theorist Gayatri Spivak applies this word to "master words" that claim to represent a group, e.g., women or the proletariat, when there are no "true" examples of "woman" or "proletarian". In a similar way, words that are imposed upon people and are deemed improper thus denote a catachresis, a word with an arbitrary connection to its meaning.

In Calvin Warren's Ontological Terror: Blackness, Nihilism, and Emancipation, catachresis refers to the ways Warren conceptualizes the figure of the black body as vessel or vehicle in which fantasy can be projected. Drawing primarily from the "Look a Negro" moment in Frantz Fanon's Black Skin, White Masks, Chapter 5: "The Fact of Blackness", Warren works from the notion that "the black body…provides form for a nothing that metaphysics works tirelessly to obliterate", in which "the black body as a vase provides form for the formlessness of nothingness.  Catachresis creates a fantastical place for representation to situate the unrepresentable (i.e. blackness as nothingness).

See also
 Cacography
 Doublespeak
 Figure of speech
 Malapropism
 Rhetoric
 Skunked term

Reading

References

Rhetoric
Figures of speech